Vanitrochus geertsi is a species of sea snail, a marine gastropod mollusk in the family Trochidae, the top snails.

Description
The size of the shell varies between 2 mm and 3 mm.

Distribution
This marine shell occurs off the Philippines.

References

External links
 

geertsi
Gastropods described in 2006